Luca Righini (born 25 December 1990) is a former Italian professional footballer who pays as a midfielder for La Fiorita in San Marino.

Career

Cesena
Born in Cesena, Emilia–Romagna, Righini started his career at A.C. Cesena. In 2006–07 season he was the member of Cesena's Allievi U17 team. From 2007 to 2010 he played for the reserve in the "spring" league.

Righini played once for the first team in January 2009.

Cesena–Vicenza swap
On 30 June 2010, the last day of 2009–10 financial year, Righini along with Denis Tonucci was sold to Serie B club Vicenza, for €450,000 and €1.3 million respectively. In exchange, Mattia Evangelisti and Giacomo Tulli were signed by Cesena also for the same price. Both clubs retained 50% registration rights. The deal created paper profit for the clubs in 2009–10 financial year but heavy cost in future seasons.

Lega Pro loans
On 31 August 2010 Righini left for Mezzocorona in temporary deal. The club also signed Filippo Forò from Vicenza and Ivan Reali from Ascoli, who sold from Vicenza in June 2010 for a flopped €0.8M. Righini played 22 games, including 14 starts for the fourth division club. In the end of 2010–11 Lega Pro Seconda Divisione the club relegated. In June 2011, Cesena and Vicenza renewed the four co-ownership deals. In July 2011 Righini left for another fourth division club Valenzana. However his clubs relegated again, including Cesena, Vicenza and Valenzana.

Cesena return
In June 2012 Cesena bought back Righini and Tonucci for €225,000 and €650,000 respectively; co-currently Evangelisti and Tulli returned to Vicenza also for €225,000 and €650,000. Except Tulli, all other 3 players were signed a 1-year contract. However, Righini was not included in the pre-season camp. His contract was extended to 30 June 2014, however.

Righini later was confirmed as a player of Teramo in temporary deal. He was released by Cesena on circa summer 2013, which reflected as a loss on 2013–14 financial year in the company audit report.

Notes

References

External links
 Football.it Profile 

Italian footballers
A.C. Cesena players
L.R. Vicenza players
A.C. Mezzocorona players
Valenzana Mado players
S.S. Teramo Calcio players
Ravenna F.C. players
Rimini F.C. 1912 players
S.P. La Fiorita players
Association football midfielders
People from Cesena
Campionato Sammarinese di Calcio players
1990 births
Living people
Serie C players
Serie D players
Italian expatriate footballers
Expatriate footballers in San Marino
Footballers from Emilia-Romagna
Sportspeople from the Province of Forlì-Cesena